Japan–Poland relations refers to the bilateral foreign relations between Japan and Poland. Both nations enjoy historically friendly relations, embracing close cooperation and mutual assistance in times of need. Both are members of the OECD, World Trade Organization and United Nations.

History

19th and early 20th century
Japanese novelist Tokai Sanshi wrote about the Partitions of Poland and the Polish independence movement. The Japanese poem Porando kaiko by Ochiai Naobumi about Fukushima Yasumasa travelling in 1890s mentions the Polish struggle for freedom. Fukushima established contacts with members of the Polish resistance movement and exiles to Siberia in order to obtain detailed information about the common enemy of the Poles and the Japanese - Russia.

Polish travelers Karol Lanckoroński and Paweł Sapieha, as well as ethnographers Bronisław Piłsudski and Wacław Sieroszewski, among others, wrote about Japan. Translations of Japanese literature, works on Japanese history and culture were published in partitioned Poland. Japanese culture and art were popularized among Poles by Feliks Jasieński, an enthusiast and collector of Japanese art.

According to Onodera, the cooperation between the Japanese and Poles dates back to the Russo-Japanese War of 1905.

In 1904, well-known Japanese writer Nitobe Inazō dedicated his book Bushido: The Soul of Japan to the Polish nation, indicating that it was a "samurai" nation. Despite the geographical and cultural distance between the cultures, this book was written at a time when the Japanese admired Poles for their heroism and honor. The book has been translated into other languages and published in other countries. Very soon, as early as 1904, a Polish version was published in Lwów, and Nitobe wrote a special preface addressed to Polish readers. He emphasized the similarities between Poles and Japanese - he wrote that both nations love honor and attachment to ideals above all else, and a reader from the Vistula River would easily understand what bushido is. The Polish edition was "corrected" in several places by censorship of its occupant, but the book still enjoyed great popularity among the Poles.

The most important moment in the context of Poland's contacts with Japan were the talks between Józef Piłsudski and Tytus Filipowicz and representatives of Japan, which took place during their visit to that country in July 1904. The visit was financed by Japan. Piłsudski and Filipowicz presented the Japanese side with the draft agreement.

It assumed that Japan would pay Poland £10,000 upon conclusion of the contract and another £10,000 in 1905. Apart from that, at the time of submitting the proposal, Piłsudski and Filipowicz expected support in the form of 3,000 weapons. At the same time, they reserved for Poland the possibility of obtaining up to 60,000 units. In return, they offered intelligence and sabotage activity on the part of Poles, as well as obstructing the mobilization of the Russian army by all possible means.
The information that may be possible shows that the economic and military cooperation between Japan and Poland was successfully implemented. Through the military attachés in Paris and London, Japan gave Poland 33,000 sterling and other funds (this is an approximation, 20 Japanese embassies). The money received was used to purchase weapons: 23,000 firearms and 4,300,000 ammunition. During the subsequent Polish cooperation with Japan, it was also enriched with 8,500 rifles and 18,100 rounds of ammunition for them, as well as with explosives. Japan also made it easier for Poles to pick up their weapons in Hamburg.

It is difficult to assess the full scale of intelligence activities conducted by Poland due to its secret nature. It is known that there were 16 Polish spies operating in Russia, cooperating with Japan. They operated in places where Russian military troops were stationed. These were Tomsk, Irkutsk, Perm and Samara; there were also headquarters in Riga and Liepaja, the purpose of which was to observe the Baltic Fleet. The Poles were to collect information about the directions of movement of Russian troops, especially those sent to the east.

During World War I, the Japanese government declared war on Germany and at the same time the Japanese elite financially supported the creation of a sovereign Polish government in exchange for professionally teaching Japanese spies to break Russian codes. General Akashi Motojiro traveled extensively around Europe. He and other Japanese financially supported Poles striving to break away from Russia. An important rapprochement between Japanese and Polish officers was the honorary treatment of Poles who had repeatedly hosted Japanese officers visiting or stationed at their diplomatic missions in Warsaw.

Interbellum

Japan and Poland established diplomatic relations on March 22, 1919, months after Poland regained its independence in November 1918. In the 1920s, a trade treaty was signed and military cooperation was established. Japanese-Polish friendship societies were formed in both countries, and literature was translated and publications were issued on topics related to the cultures of both countries. As a token of Poland's friendship with Japan, over 50 Japanese officers were awarded the Virtuti Militari, Poland's highest military decoration, for their achievements during the Russo-Japanese War.

During Bolshevik rule in Russia, the Japanese government undertook a rescue operation to help Polish children deported to Siberia. Japanese ships transported Polish children to Tokyo, where the Japanese Red Cross gave them protection and then helped them return to Poland. The Japanese government moved swiftly in response to the call for help, asking the Japanese Red Cross Society to undertake coordination of the project. Japanese Army soldiers had been deployed in Siberia after the Russian Revolution and were there to help. In the end, a total of 765 Polish orphans scattered throughout many Siberian regions were rescued during the period from 1920 to 1922. The orphans were transported by military ships from Vladivostok to the port of the city of Tsuruga in Japan's Fukui Prefecture. They were then cared for in childcare institutions in Tokyo and Osaka. There is a storied incident that happened when the children were about to return home. Having been looked after with great affection at the childcare institutions where they were placed, the Polish orphans refused to leave Japan. Finally parting reluctantly, the orphans sang “Kimigayo” - Japan's national anthem - when they boarded the ship bound for Poland, thus expressing their feelings of gratitude.

Based on the rescue of Polish children from Siberia through Japan, the movie Warushawa-no Aki (English: Autumn in Warsaw) was made, directed by Hiroki Hayashi. The guardian of Polish children was played by the Japanese actress Yūko Takeuchi, known for her role in the Japanese film Ring.

Both countries formed a silent alliance against the Soviet Union and agreed upon sharing intelligence they obtained. In the interwar period, Japanese cryptologists visited Poland, where Polish specialists wrote the methods of Russian phrases. Onodera claimed that until 1939 the center of the Japanese intelligence aimed at Russia was located in Warsaw. The Japanese relied heavily on the new Polish secret service for training in decryption and continued their close military co-operation even after the German invasion of Poland, which started World War II. Japan rejected war with Poland for this reason. The Japanese relied on the vast Polish network of spies and allowed the Poles to openly place their agents inside embassies of its protectorate of Manchukuo. Their military cooperation was so close that the Japanese ambassador was one of the people involved in the smuggling of a Polish flag made for the London-based Polish Air Squadron. Before the war, Japan wanted Poland to join the Axis countries. At the time of the signing the Molotov–Ribbentrop Pact and subsequent attack on Poland, Japan declared that from now on it would never trust Adolf Hitler anymore and would only use him for its own purposes, so as not to help Nazi Germany in the war with the Soviets at the end of the war. The Nazis knew about the close cooperation between Poland and Japan and Hitler ultimately not receiving support from Japan when Nazis fought against USSR. During a private briefing on 5 March 1943, Hitler remarked:

A statue of Polish anthropologist Bronisław Piłsudski stands in Japan, who was a researcher of the local culture in Japan and married an Ainu woman who was a citizen of Imperial Japan. He was also the brother of the Polish marshal Józef Piłsudski, who established close cooperation with the Imperial Japanese government in order to jointly attack the Soviet Union. The plan failed due to the marshal's death. Jozef Pilsudski died in 1935, the 10th year of the Showa Era. Paying respect to this good friend of Japan, soil from the grounds of the Yasukuni Shrine was scattered around his tomb in Kraków, one of the most culturally and politically significant cities of Poland. This is another tribute to the strength of ties between Japan and Poland. These little-known historical facts about the friendly ties between Japan and Poland have at last been acknowledged publicly, thanks to many laborious years of research by Professor Palasz-Rutkowska in her book, "History of Polish-Japanese Relations 1904-1945."

An additional curiosity may be the fact that from August 27 to September 25, 1926, on the Bréguet 19 A2 plane, Polish pilot Bolesław Orliński together with mechanic Leonard Kubiak made a multi-stage flight from Warsaw to Tokyo, on a route of 10,300 km and back, despite the damage to the propeller and the lower wing on the way (the last 6,680 km of the route was covered by the plane with the left lower wing partially cut off), and a very worn (due to oil loss) engine. In Japan, Polish airmen were enthusiastically received. For his flight, Orliński was awarded the Imperial Japanese Order of the Rising Sun 6th class and the Gold Medal of the Imperial Aviation Society, and after his return he was promoted to captain.

In 1930, Polish monks Maksymilian Kolbe and Zeno Żebrowski began their mission in Japan, and the latter remained in Japan until his death in 1982, bringing aid to orphans, the elderly, the poor and the disabled.

World War II

During World War II, despite being allied with Nazi Germany, the Empire of Japan along with Italy did not diplomatically support the Nazi invasion of Poland, and the Japanese actively supported the Polish government-in-exile. This decision was dictated by the Japanese distrust of their Nazi allies, who had made a secret pact with the Soviet Union. Thus, the Japanese government decided to continue to rely on Polish spies even after a formal declaration of war by Poland in 1941. The declaration of war from Poland was rejected by Japanese prime minister Hideki Tojo under the pretense that the Polish government in exile was forced to issue it in compliance with its alliance to both the United Kingdom and the United States, making the declaration legally void. This ensured co-operation between the two intelligence services in gathering information on both the Soviet Union and Third Reich. The Japanese agents in Europe during World War II continued to support the Polish struggle for freedom against Soviet Union and Third Reich forces as far as the Japanese interests went. At the turn of 1939 and 1940, the Japanese helped secretly evacuate a portion of the Polish gold reserve, the part held in Lithuanian-annexed Wilno to neutral Sweden. Chiune Sugihara, Japanese vice-consul in Kaunas, played a key role in the operation and also closely co-operated with Polish intelligence. The Japanese agents also sheltered Polish-Jewish refugees fleeing occupation from both German and Soviet forces, though at first it was done without proper authorization from the Imperial government in Tokyo. Therefore, Chiune Sugihara had to prove to the authorities that the refugees would be traveling through Japan only as a transit country to the United States and not be staying permanently, which eventually led to him gaining full legal approval and assistance from the Government of Japan. Tadeusz Romer, ambassador of Poland in Japan, helped the Polish-Jewish refugees after they arrived to Japan. Throughout the secret alliance, Polish agents never disclosed information about their Western allies and shared information only pertaining to the Third Reich and the Soviet Union.

Modern relations

Japan established a relationship with the Polish United Workers' Party (PZPR) that represented the Soviet-controlled Polish puppet state in 1957, while at the same time continuing to be allied with the London-based Polish national government in exile, and later supported the merging of these two in 1989 to form the modern Polish state. Since 1990, the number of official visits by top government officials to both countries has increased. Both countries share mutual interests and alliances that forged them closer to each other. In 1994, the Polish-Japanese Academy of Information Technology in Warsaw was established. In 2011, the Polish Institute in Tokyo was founded.

In 1995, there came a time when Poland had the chance to give back to Japan for the rescue of Polish orphans from Siberia in the early 1920s. Poland was kind enough to invite Japanese children stricken with great loss from the 1995 Great Hanshin earthquake. The children, many from Kobe and nearby areas of western Japan, went to Poland and stayed from 1995 to 1996, while the chaos and loss caused by the earthquake was sorted out. Poland repeated this kindness after the Great East Japan Earthquake in 2011. On November 20, 2018, a school in the suburbs of Warsaw was named after the Japanese Army operations that rescued Polish orphans: “Siberia Orphans Commemoration Elementary School.”

The two states celebrated 90 years of relationship in 2009 and the 100th anniversary in 2019. Trade, business, and tourism between both countries continues to thrive. LOT Polish Airlines provides daily non-stop flights between Tokyo and Warsaw. Both countries are full members of the OECD, but modern relations are limited to mostly trade and cultural activities, both countries see each other as vital partners in global commerce. In 2017, Japan became the second largest foreign investor in Poland in terms of total investment value, only behind the United States.

Culture
In Poland, there is a museum devoted to Japanese art and technology – the Manggha in Kraków. Several other museums also possess collections of Japanese art and artifacts, including the National Museum in Warsaw, District Museum in Toruń and National Museum in Szczecin.

In Tokyo, there is a Polish Institute.

Embassies and consulates

 Poland has an embassy in Tokyo, and honorary consulates in Kobe and Hiroshima.
 Japan has an embassy in Warsaw, and an honorary consulate in Kraków.

See also
 Foreign relations of Japan 
 Foreign relations of Poland

References

External links
Embassy of Poland in Tokyo
Embassy of Japan in Warsaw 

 
Poland
Bilateral relations of Poland